The Irish League in season 1979–80 comprised 12 teams, and Linfield won the championship.

League standings

Results

References
Northern Ireland - List of final tables (RSSSF)

NIFL Premiership seasons
1979–80 in Northern Ireland association football
North